Neurophyseta villarda is a moth in the family Crambidae. It was described by Eugenie Phillips-Rodriguez and Maria Alma Solis in 1996. It is found in Costa Rica.

Etymology
The species is named for the Villard Public School in Villard, Minnesota.

References

Moths described in 1996
Musotiminae